Mansfield is a town in Bristol County, Massachusetts, United States. As of the United States 2020 Census, the town population is 23,860. Mansfield is in the south-southwest suburbs of Boston and is also close to Providence, Rhode Island. The village of Mansfield Center is located in the town. The town is twinned with Mansfield in Nottinghamshire, England.

History
The area to become Mansfield was first scouted in 1640 by Captain Miles Standish, settled in 1658 and was officially incorporated in 1775. It was named for William Murray, 1st Earl of Mansfield, a pro-colonial member of the House of Lords. Mansfield is the home of the Xfinity Center (formerly known as Great Woods, Tweeter Center and Comcast Center) concert venue, one of the most popular in New England. It is also the birthplace of Honey Dew Donuts, a regional New England chain of donut shops. The first Honey Dew was opened at 221 North Main Street on June 6, 1973.

Benjamin E. Bates, an industrialist and philanthropist, who was the founder of Bates College was born in Mansfield in 1808.  Stove and furnace manufacturer and innovator Gordon Chilson (1804–1877) worked here.

Geography
There are five conservation areas in the town. They are, from largest to smallest: the Great Woods Conservation Area, Maple Park Conservation Area, York Conservation Area, Marie Strese Conservation Area, and Sweet Pond Conservation Area. The town is bisected by the Canoe, Rumford and Wading Rivers, as well as many small brooks which are all part of the Taunton River Watershed.

Mansfield's location is 28 miles south of Boston, 14 miles west of Brockton, and 19 miles north of Providence, Rhode Island. It is bordered by Foxborough and Sharon to the north, Easton to the east, Norton to the south, and North Attleborough and Attleboro to the west. The town's northern border is also a portion of the northern border of Bristol County. Its neighborhoods include East Mansfield, Whiteville, Ginty Corner, Mansfield Center, Purdy Corner, Robinsonville and West Mansfield.

Demographics

As of the census of 2000, there were 22,414 people, 7,942 households, and 5,861 families residing in the town. The racial makeup of the town was 94.30% White, 2.18% African American, 0.21% Native American, 1.93% Asian, 0.02% Pacific Islander, 0.43% from other races, and 0.94% from two or more races. Hispanic or Latino of any race were 1.41% of the population.

There were 7,942 households, out of which 44.7% had children under the age of 18 living with them, 62.2% were married couples living together, 8.9% had a female householder with no husband present, and 26.2% were non-families. 21.1% of all households were made up of individuals, and 5.9% had someone living alone who was 65 years of age or older. The average household size was 2.82 and the average family size was 3.34.

In the town, the population was spread out, with 31.4% under the age of 18, 5.3% from 18 to 24, 38.1% from 25 to 44, 18.9% from 45 to 64, and 6.4% who were 65 years of age or older. The median age was 34 years. For every 100 females, there were 99.4 males. For every 100 females age 18 and over, there were 94.8 males.

The median income for a household in the town was $66,925, and the median income for a family was $78,058 (these figures had risen to $93,533 and $111,316 respectively as of a 2007 estimate). Males had a median income of $52,416 versus $36,658 for females. The per capita income for the town was $27,441. About 3.0% of families and 4.5% of the population were below the poverty line, including 3.6% of those under age 18 and 12.9% of those age 65 or over.

Government
The town is governed by an open town meeting, and is managed by a select board and town manager. The Mansfield Public Safety Complex, completed in 2019, houses the police and fire departments and is located in Mansfield Center on Route 106. There is also a secondary fire station located in West Mansfield. The Mansfield Public Library is located at Memorial Park, and the post office is near the intersection of Routes 106 & 140. In addition to Memorial Park, the town also has the Magna-Vista Recreation Area.

On the state level, the town is represented in the State Senate as a portion of the Bristol and Norfolk district (represented by Paul Feeney), including Dover, Foxborough, Mansfield, Medfield, Norton, Rehoboth, Seekonk and Walpole, as well as parts of Attleboro and Sharon. The town is a part of three separate state representative districts, the First and Fourteenth Bristol and Eighth Norfolk districts. The First Bristol district is represented by Jay Barrows, a Mansfield native who frequently makes appearances at town events. The Fourteenth Bristol and Eighth Norfolk districts are represented by Adam Scanlon and Ted Phillips, respectively. The town is also patrolled by Troop H (Metro Boston region) of the Massachusetts State Police, 3rd District (Foxborough barracks). On the national level, the town is part of Massachusetts Congressional District 4, which is represented by Jake Auchincloss. The state's senior (Class II) Senator, elected in 2012, is Elizabeth Warren and the state's junior (Class I) Senator, elected in 2013, is Ed Markey.

Education

The first school record in Mansfield is in 1719 when Thomas Skinner was chosen to be the first school master. School was taught out of people's homes until the first school building was built in 1793. The school was a small brick building and was in poor condition by 1850. Mansfield's first high school came to be in 1872 under the direction of Rev. A. F. Frost.

Mansfield currently has its own school department consisting of five schools, governed by a superintendent of schools (whose office is located directly adjacent to the town hall) and a school committee. (Coincidentally, the school department building was once the public library and before that, it was the town hall, and the town hall was once the high school.) There are five schools serving various levels within the town: the Roland Green Preschool, the Everett W. Robinson Elementary School (serving grades K–2), the Jordan-Jackson Elementary School (serving grades 3–5), the Harold L. Qualters Middle School (serving grades 6–8), and Mansfield High School. Mansfield's teams are nicknamed the Hornets, and their colors are green and white. For many years in the 1980s and early 1990s, the school's marching band hosted the first event of the New England Scholastic Band Association's fall field show competition season. Other than the Roland Green Preschool, all the town's schools are located on either side of East Street near the center of town.

In addition to the public schools within the town, Mansfield residents can also send their children to the Foxboro Regional Charter School free of charge.  High school students may also attend Southeastern Regional Vocational-Technical High School in Easton or Bristol County Agricultural High School in Dighton free of charge.  The town has one parochial school, Saint Mary's Catholic School, which serves grades Pre-K–8, and an Islamic high school, Al-Noor Academy, which opened in 2000 and serves the Islamic community along the I-95 corridor.

Mansfield is also known for its outstanding high school sports and music programs. Football, soccer, baseball, boys' and girls' basketball, lacrosse, track and field (Men), and Women's Indoor and Outdoor Track and Field teams have won multiple league, division, and all-state titles. In 2013 and 2019, the Mansfield Hornets football team won the Division 2 state title, and in 2018, the boys' basketball team won the state Division 1 championship, defeating Hockomock League rival Franklin at the Mass Mutual Center in Springfield. Mansfield High football and girls' basketball coach Michael Redding was inducted into the state football coaches' hall of fame in 2019. The Mansfield music program has also won many awards over the years. The school’s percussion ensemble has won many regional championships in the NESBA (New England Scholastic Band Association) circuit and the international championship held by WGI (Winter Guard International) in 2015. The school also has a growing marching band (which competes in NESBA and USBands), concert band, choir, and orchestra.

Library

The Mansfield Public Library was established in 1884. In fiscal year 2008, the town of Mansfield spent 0.86% ($605,929) of its budget on its public library—some $25 per person, per year ($30.62 adjusted for inflation in 2021).

Transportation
One of the intersections of Interstates 95 and 495 is located on the Mansfield-Foxborough town line, with both highways going through the town. Additionally, the town includes open and limited-access sections of Route 140, as well as part of Route 106. The only exits off the interstates which are located within the town are I-495 Exit 31 (linking to a limited access section of Rt. 140 North from both directions of I-495) and I-95 Exit 13 (linking to Rt. 140 North / South and South Main Street).  The town also has a stop along the MBTA's commuter line between Providence and Boston, and is serviced by Mansfield Municipal Airport, which serves smaller aircraft. Mansfield is effectively equidistant between two international airports, with parts of the town being closer to either Logan International Airport in Boston or T.F. Green Airport in Warwick, Rhode Island, each of which is approximately 30 to 35 miles from the town.

Notable people

 Benjamin Bates IV (born 1808), American industrialist
 Don Currivan (born 1920), Football Player
 Mark Farinella (born 1954), long-time sportswriter for The Sun Chronicle of Attleboro, Mass., and advocate for women's sports
 Tom Gilson (born 1988), Arena Football League player
 Jeff Hill, covered Pat Connaughton in the D1 state title game
 Shawnae Jebbia (born 1971), Miss Massachusetts USA 1998 and Miss USA 1998
 Samuel Crocker Lovell (born 1839), US Army lieutenant that led a contingent of soldiers assigned to escort Confederate Gen. Robert E. Lee to his home after the surrender at Appomattox, VA
 Frank Jerome Murray (born 1904), US federal judge
 Charlie Romero (born 1989), soccer player 
 Jen Royle (born 1974), former reporter turned chef
 Laban Wheaton (born 1846), US Representative from Massachusetts

References

External links

 
 Town of Mansfield Official Web Site
 Mansfield Public Schools
 Mansfield News

 
Towns in Bristol County, Massachusetts
Providence metropolitan area
Towns in Massachusetts